Avant que l'ombre... à Bercy is the fourth live album by Mylène Farmer, released on 4 December 2006.

Background 

Six years after her Mylenium Tour, Mylène Farmer came back on stage with a tour in 2006 which included 13 shows at Bercy, in Paris. This very successful series of concerts started on 13 January and ended 16 days later, on 29 January. As after each of her tour, Farmer decided to launch a live album retracing her concert. Thus, Jérome Devoise mixed the 20 songs performed on stage and the album "Avant que l'ombre... à Bercy" was eventually released on 4 December 2006 as CDs and DVDs, under various editions.

The album contains songs from all Farmer's studio albums, except Cendres de Lune and Innamoramento. The production enjoys very high quality in terms of sound effects. Some of the old hits were re-orchestred in a much modern version, while the slow songs from the last studio album are recorded in a more stripped style.

The various formats, particularly the DVD box, had huge success: the video was certified Diamond after a single week of release.

The two singles from this album, "Avant que l'ombre..." and "Déshabillez-moi", achieved a minor success in term of sales, but were both top ten hits in France.

Critical reception 

This album was, on the whole, well received by media and contemporary pop music critics. Nicolas Gardon, in L'Echo Republicain, said that this album offers an "fair performance, but only a few surprises: the shimmering and coloured universe of Mylène Farmer is perfectly reproduced in this double CD. The release of this DVD was regarded as "the event of the week" by the magazine Télé Star.

Dvdrama qualifies the DVD as "sublime" video, specifying: "The image of this concert exceeds in all respects the nevertheless perfect image of the previous two already available concerts. The red and the black, the dominant colors, are staggering of beauty". On the other hand, it expressed some little criticisms on the quality of the sound.

Commercial performance 

In France, the DVD was sold to 98,000 copies in its first week of release — what constitutes a record. On the French Videos Chart, it debuted at number 1 for four consecutive weeks and stayed in the top ten for 13 weeks. It managed to remain in the top 40 until 17 November 2007. Certified diamond, this DVD was, only 15 days after its release, the second best-selling video of 2006, just behind the musical Le Roi Soleil.

The CD was sold to 41,034 copies in the week of its release, and, as for the DVD, it went straight to number 1 on the French Albums Chart on 9 December 2006. However, it dropped to #8 the following week, stayed only for eight weeks in the top 50 and left the chart (Top 200) after its 18th week. So the DVD was preferred by the buyers. The album was nevertheless the 57th best-selling album of 2006 and totaled approximately 130,000 copies sold. It was certified Gold disc by the SNEP.

In Belgium Wallonia, the CD entered the album chart at #9 on 16 December 2006, and reached its peak position, #3, the week after. However, it dropped quickly then and stabilized in the last positions. It left the chart (Top 40) on 6 April 2007, after 12 weeks of attendance. 
The DVD started directly to number 1 and kept this position for eight consecutive weeks. It stayed in the top ten for a total of 32 weeks. So, in Belgium too, the DVD was more sold than the CD.

The live CD was also charted in Switzerland, but had a moderate success in this country. It went to #20 on 17 December 2006 and reached its peak position, #18, the following week. After that, it kept on dropping and left the Top 100 after its 11 week.

Track listings

CD 

 CD 1
 Introduction (5:30)
 "Peut-être toi" (3:27)
 "XXL" (5:27)
 "Dans les rues de Londres" (4:18)
 "California" (5:19)
 "Porno graphique" (4:13)
 "Sans contrefaçon" (4:46)
 "Q.I" (6:58)
 "C'est une belle journée" (8:21)
 "Ange, parle-moi" (4:50)
 "Redonne-moi" (5:44)

 CD 2
 "Rêver" (7:42)
 "L'Autre" (7:25)
 "Désenchantée" (6:42)
 "Nobody Knows" (5:36)
 "Je t'aime mélancolie" (4:53)
 "L'amour n'est rien..." (5:05)
 "Déshabillez-moi" (4:12)
 "Les Mots" (5:06)
 "Fuck Them All" (6:42)
 "Avant que l'ombre..." (7:26)

DVD 

 Introduction (7:32)
 "Peut-être toi" (3:22)
 "XXL" (5:27)
 "Dans les rues de Londres" (4:16)
 "California" (5:15)
 "Porno graphique" (4:07)
 "Sans contrefaçon" (4:48)
 "Q.I" (6:50)
 "C'est une belle journée" (4:14)
 "Ange, parle-moi" (4:32)
 "Redonne-moi" (5:36)
 "Rêver" (7:41)
 "L'Autre" (7:25)
 "Désenchantée" (9:08)
 "Nobody Knows" (5:36)
 "Je t'aime mélancolie" (4:47)
 "L'amour n'est rien..." (4:59)
 "Déshabillez-moi" (3:54)
 "Les Mots" (5:05)
 "Fuck Them All" (8:18)
 "Avant que l'ombre..." (7:45)
 Générique de fin (3:56)

The second DVD contains several bonuses ("L'Ombre des autres", "Scene by scene views", "Works by Escalle", "Haute Couture", "Live Alternative"), and a hidden bonus: "La Cassar mobile".

Album charts

Weekly album charts

Year-end album charts

DVD charts

Weekly DVD charts

Year-end DVD charts

Certifications and sales

Credits 

 Text: Mylène Farmer
Except: "Déshabillez-moi": Robert Nyel
 Music: Laurent Boutonnat
Except: "L'amour n'est rien...": Mylène Farmer and Laurent Boutonnat; "Déshabillez-moi": Gaby Verlor
 Editions: Requiem Publishing
Except: "Sans contrefaçon": Universal Music Publishing / BMG Music Publishing France; "Déshabillez-moi": Intersong
 Record label: Polydor
 Production: Stuffed Monkey
 Recorded and mixed by Jérôme Devoise, with Tristan Monrocq, at Studio Guillaume Tell
 Executive production: Paul Van Parys
 Mastering: André Perriat, at Top Master
 Management: Thierry Suc
 Photography: Claude Gassian
 Design: Henry Neu / Com' N.B

For more details about credits and personnel, see: Avant que l'ombre... à Bercy (tour).

Formats 

 Audio
 Double CD
 Double CD — Collector
 Quadruple 7"
 Audio & Video
 Collector edition (2 CD + 2 DVD) - Limited edition (7,500)

 Video
 Double DVD
 Double DVD — Collector
 Blu-ray (since September 2008)

References 

Mylène Farmer live albums
Mylène Farmer video albums
2006 video albums
Live video albums
2006 live albums
Polydor Records live albums
Polydor Records video albums